Coláiste Ráithín is a secondary school located in Bray, County Wicklow, Ireland, which was founded in 1991.

It is run by the Education and Training Board. The 340 pupils are taught through the medium of the Irish language. Ráithín is always amongst the top three university feeder schools in County Wicklow.

The school was awaiting a new school building for some time as the current location was too cramped for the ever-increasing student base. Students began moving to the new building in September 2018.

References

1990 establishments in Ireland
Education in Bray, County Wicklow
1991 establishments in Ireland
Gaelcholáiste
Irish-language education
Secondary schools in County Wicklow